Harvey L. Vanier (April 21, 1924 - December 1, 2013) was an American trainer, owner and breeder of Thoroughbred racehorses. With his wife Nancy Aiken-Vanier, they owned and bred racehorses on their Fairberry Farm in Waterloo, Illinois.

Vanier began his career in Thoroughbred racing as a jockey, first riding as a boy of 12 at state and county fairs. Once old enough to obtain a professional license, he rode at Nebraska tracks. Weight gain ended his riding career in his late teens and in 1942 he turned to training. However, that was short-lived when he joined the United States Army and would serve in Europe during World War II.

References

1924 births
2013 deaths
United States Army personnel of World War II
American jockeys
American horse trainers
American racehorse owners and breeders
People from Jefferson County, Nebraska
People from Waterloo, Illinois